Juglans regia, the Persian walnut, English walnut, Carpathian walnut, Madeira walnut, or especially in Great Britain, common walnut, is an Old World walnut tree species native to the region stretching from the Balkans eastward to the Himalayas and southwest China. It is widely cultivated across Europe and Caucasus.

It is the origin of cultivated varieties which produce the edible walnut, consumed around the world. China is the major commercial producer of walnuts.

Description

The bark is smooth, olive-brown when young and silvery-grey on older branches, and features scattered broad fissures with a rougher texture. Like all walnuts, the pith of the twigs contains air spaces; this chambered pith is brownish in color. The leaves are alternately arranged, 25–40 cm (10 to 16 in) long, odd-pinnate with 5–9 leaflets, paired alternately with one terminal leaflet. The largest leaflets are the three at the apex, 10–18 cm (4 to 7 in) long and 6–8 cm (2 to 3 in) broad; the basal pair of leaflets are much smaller, 5–8 cm (2 to 3 in) long, with the margins of the leaflets entire. The male flowers are in drooping catkins 5–10 cm (2 to 4 in) long, and the female flowers are terminal, in clusters of two to five, ripening in the autumn into a fruit with a green, semifleshy husk and a brown, corrugated nut. The whole fruit, including the husk, falls in autumn; the seed is large, with a relatively thin shell, and edible, with a rich flavour.

Etymology 

The Latin name for the walnut was nux Gallica, "Gallic nut"; the Gaulish region of Galatia in Anatolia lies in highlands at the western end of the tree's presumed natural distribution.

For the etymology and meaning of the word in English and other Germanic languages, see "walnut".

"Walnut" does not distinguish the tree from other species of Juglans. Other names include common walnut in Britain; Persian walnut in South Africa and Australia; and English walnut in North America and Great Britain, New Zealand, and Australia, the latter name possibly because English sailors were prominent in Juglans regia nut distribution at one time. Alternatively, Walter Fox Allen stated in his 1912 treatise What You Need to Know About Planting, Cultivating and Harvesting this Most Delicious of Nuts: "In America, it has commonly been known as English walnut to distinguish it from our native species."

In the Chinese language, the edible, cultivated walnut is called  (hú táo in Mandarin), which means literally "Hu peach", suggesting the ancient Chinese associated the introduction of the tree into East Asia with the Hu barbarians of the regions north and northwest of China.  In Mexico, it is called , suggesting the Mexicans associated the introduction of the tree into Mexico with Spaniards from Castile (as opposed to the black walnuts native to North America).

The Old English term wealhhnutu is a late book-name (Old English Vocabularies, Wright & Wulker), so the remark that the Anglo-Saxons inherited the walnut tree from the Romans does not follow from this name. Old English: walhhnutu is wealh (foreign) + hnutu (nut). Etymologically it "meant the nut of the Roman lands (Gaul and Italy) as distinguished from the native hazel" according to the Oxford English Dictionary.

Distribution and habitat

Original habitat
One of the centers of origin and diversity of Juglans regia is Iran. However, as with other old and widespread cultivated plants, it is not easy to reconstruct the original distribution and determine the borders of the past natural ranges. There are many reports concerning the earliest fossil pollen and nuts of J. regia, and the conclusions that various authors draw are somewhat contradictory. Taken together these finds suggest that J. regia possibly survived the last glaciations in several refugia, as the compilation of the data shows most likely southern Europe, the Near East, China, and the Himalaya.

The largest forests are in Kyrgyzstan, where trees occur in extensive forests at  altitude, notably at Arslanbob in Jalal-Abad Province .

Introduction around the world
In the fourth century BC, Alexander the Great introduced this "Persian nut" (Theophrastus' καρυα ή Περσική) in Macedonian, Ancient Greek ancestral forms with lateral fruiting from Iran and Central Asia. They hybridized with terminal-bearing forms to give lateral-bearing trees with larger fruit. These lateral-bearers were spread in southern Europe and northern Africa by Romans. Recent prospections in walnut populations of the Mediterrean Basin allowed to select interesting trees of this type. In the Middle Ages, the lateral-bearing character was introduced again in southern Turkey by merchants travelling along the Silk Road. J. regia germplasm in China is thought to have been introduced from Central Asia about 2,000 years ago, and in some areas has become naturalized. Cultivated J. regia was introduced into western and northern Europe very early, in Roman times or earlier, and to the Americas in the 17th century, by English colonists. Important nut-growing regions include California in the United States; France, Serbia, Greece, Bulgaria, Romania and Hungary in Europe; China in Asia; Baja California and Coahuila in Mexico; and Chile in Latin America. Lately, cultivation has spread to other regions, such as New Zealand and the southeast of Australia. It is cultivated extensively from 30° to 50° of latitude in the Northern Hemisphere and from 30° to 40° in the Southern Hemisphere. Its high-quality fruits are eaten both fresh or pressed for their richly flavored oil; numerous cultivars have been selected for larger nuts with thinner shells.

Ecology 
It tends to grow taller and narrower in dense forest competition. It is a light-demanding species, requiring full sun to grow well.

Juglans regia is infested by Rhagoletis juglandis, commonly known as the walnut husk fly, which lays its eggs in the husks of walnut fruit.

Other plants often will not grow under walnut trees because the fallen leaves and husks contain juglone, a chemical which acts as a natural herbicide. Horses that eat walnut leaves may develop laminitis, a hoof ailment.

Cultivation 

Walnut trees grow best in rich, deep soil with full sun and long summers, such as the California central valley. Juglans hindsii and J. hindsii × J. regia are often used as grafting stock for J. regia.

Cultivars

Walnut cultivars include:

Pests 
Particular cultivars of J. regia may be more infested by R. juglandis than others because of varying walnut husk softness or thickness. 'Eureka', 'Klondike', 'Payne', 'Franquette' and 'Ehrhardt' cultivars are among the most susceptible to infestation.

Production 
In 2019, world production of shelled walnuts was 4.5 million tonnes, led by China with 56% of the total harvested (table). Secondary producers were the United States and Iran.

Toxicity

Allergy
Walnuts and other tree nuts are food allergen sources having potential to cause life-threatening, IgE-mediated allergic reactions in some individuals.

Uses

Nutrition 
English walnut kernels are 4% water, 65% fat, 15% protein, and 14% carbohydrates (table). In a 100 gram reference amount providing 654 calories, the kernels supply several dietary minerals in rich content (20% or more of the Daily Value, DV), including manganese (162% DV), phosphorus (49% DV), magnesium (45% DV), zinc (33% DV), and iron (22% DV) among others, the B vitamins, B6 (42% DV), thiamine (30% DV), and folate (25% DV), and dietary fiber (table).

One study of various cultivars of J. regia in Turkey showed the fatty acid composition included about 6% palmitic acid, 3% stearic acid, 30% oleic acid, 50% linoleic acid, and 9% linolenic acid.

Wood
Walnut heartwood is a heavy, hard, open-grained hardwood. Freshly cut live wood may be Dijon-mustard colour, darkening to brown over a few days. The dried lumber is a rich chocolate-brown to black, with cream to tan sapwood, and may feature unusual figures, such as "curly", "bee's wing", "bird's eye", and "rat tail", among others. It is prized by fine woodworkers for its durability, lustre and chatoyance, and is used for high-end flooring, guitars, furniture, veneers, knobs and handles as well as gunstocks.

Other uses 
The Native American Navajo tribe has been documented using the hulls of the nut to create a brown dye.

Culture
In Skopelos, a Greek island in the Aegean Sea, local legend suggests whoever plants a walnut tree will die as soon as the tree can "see" the sea. Most planting is done by field rats (subfamily Murinae).  In Flanders, a folk saying states: "By the time the tree is big, the planter surely will be dead." (plantertje dood). These sayings refer to the relatively slow growth rate and late fruiting of the tree.

Benevento in southern Italy is the home of an ancient tradition of stregoneria. The witches of Benevento were reputed to come from all over Italy to gather for their sabbats under the sacred walnut tree of Benevento. In 1526, Judge Paolo Grillandi wrote of witches in Benevento who worship a goddess at the site of an old walnut tree. This legend inspired many cultural works, including the 1812 ballet Il Noce di Benevento (the walnut tree of Benevento) by Salvatore Viganò and Franz Xaver Süssmayr, a theme from which was adapted into a violin piece called Le Streghe by Niccolò Paganini. The Beneventan liqueur Strega depicts on its label the famous walnut tree with the witches dancing under it.

See also
 Taxonomy of walnut tree varieties

References

External links
 Juglans regia - information, genetic conservation units and related resources. European Forest Genetic Resources Programme
 Flora of Pakistan: Juglans regia

regia
Edible nuts and seeds
Trees of Asia
Trees of Europe
Trees of the Indian subcontinent
Trees of Western Asia
Flora of Central Asia
Flora of China
Flora of England
Flora of Kyrgyzstan
Flora of India (region)
Flora of Iran
Flora of Xinjiang
Flora of Ukraine
Medicinal plants of Asia
Medicinal plants of Europe
Plant dyes
Plants described in 1753
Taxa named by Carl Linnaeus
Garden plants of Asia
Garden plants of Europe
Ornamental trees
Fruit trees
Trees of Nepal
Flora of Malta